Mele Vojvodich Jr. (March 28, 1929 – November 3, 2003) was an American aviator and major general in the United States Air Force. He was one of the initial five pilots who flew reconnaissance missions in the Lockheed A-12 surveillance aircraft over North Vietnam for the CIA.

Biography

Early life
Mele Vojvodich Jr. was born in Steubenville, Ohio, to Mele Vojvodic who was Serbian. He graduated from Wintersville High School in Wintersville, Ohio. In June 1947, he joined the US Air Force.

Korean War
Vojvodich earned his pilot wings in 1950 at Nellis Air Force Base in Nevada.
He would see action in the Korean War flying the Lockheed F-80C Shooting Star and the North American F-86. Vojvodich flew a reconnaissance mission 300 miles into communist China to detect the presence of Soviet-made bombers. Vojvodich completed a total of 125 combat missions.

Career highlights
After returning from Korea, Vojvodich served as Republic F-84 pilot and aircraft commander in the early 1950s at Turner Air Force Base in Georgia. He completed Squadron Officer School at Maxwell Air Force Base in Alabama six years after earning his wings.

CIA career
Vojvodich volunteered and was selected to fly the Lockheed A-12 for the CIA. He was transferred out of the USAF and "sheep dipped" into the CIA to fly as Government service employee. He would later be reinstated in the USAF.

Later career
In 1971 he completed studies at the National War College at Fort Lesley J. McNair in Washington DC.

Vojvodich was promoted to major general on May 1, 1980. He accumulated 6,000 flying hours in his career and retired in March 1983.

Death
Vojvodich died in Schertz, Texas from leukemia in his home on November 3, 2003.

Military awards
Distinguished Service Cross
Air Force Distinguished Service Medal with oak leaf cluster
Legion of Merit with oak leaf cluster
Distinguished Flying Cross with three oak leaf clusters
Meritorious Service Medal
Air Medal
Air Force Commendation Medal
Army Commendation Medal
Intelligence Star for Valor presented by the CIA.
National Defense Service Medal with star
Korean Service Medal
Vietnam Service Medal
Vietnam Gallantry Cross with palm
United Nations Korea Medal

Distinguished Service Cross citation
The President of the United States of America, under the provisions of the Act of Congress approved July 9, 1918, takes pleasure in presenting the Distinguished Service Cross (Air Force) to Captain Mele Vojvodich, Jr., United States Air Force, for extraordinary heroism in connection with military operations against an armed enemy of the United Nations while serving as a Pilot with the 15th Tactical Reconnaissance Squadron, 67th Tactical Reconnaissance Group, FIFTH Air Force, in action against enemy forces in the Republic of Korea on 3 January 1953. On that date Captain Vojvodich volunteered to fly an unarmed RF-86 type aircraft on an extremely hazardous mission of greatest importance to United Nations forces. Captain Vojvodich, exhibiting outstanding personal courage and skill, flew his unarmed aircraft deep into heavily defended enemy territory despite constant attacks from enemy aircraft. On his way to the target complex, he experienced a complete radio failure, and in addition, his drop tanks failed to jettison. Notwithstanding these obstacles, Captain Vojvodich, recognizing the vital importance of his assigned mission, elected to complete the photograph runs on his targets, exposing himself to firing passes from enemy aircraft. In order to insure complete coverage, Captain Vojvodich returned to re-photograph his first target, despite the presence of numerous enemy aircraft in the area. The intelligence data Captain Vojvodich obtained at great personal risk was of immeasurable value to subsequent United Nations operation in Korea.

General Orders: Headquarters, Far East Air Forces: General Orders No. 216 (May 2, 1953)

See also
 USAF units and aircraft of the Korean War

References

Bibliography

 Robarge, David Archangel: CIA's Supersonic A-12 Reconnaissance Aircraft – From Drawing Board to Factory Floor Central Intelligence Agency

1929 births
2003 deaths
United States Air Force generals
United States Air Force personnel of the Korean War
United States Air Force personnel of the Vietnam War
American Korean War pilots
American Vietnam War pilots
American people of Serbian descent
Aviators from Ohio
Deaths from cancer in Texas
Deaths from leukemia
People from Steubenville, Ohio
Military personnel from Ohio
Recipients of the Distinguished Flying Cross (United States)
Recipients of the Distinguished Service Cross (United States)
Recipients of the Legion of Merit
People of the Central Intelligence Agency